KBHU-FM (89.1 FM) and KJKT-FM (90.7 FM) are radio stations broadcasting a College radio  format. Licensed to Spearfish, South Dakota, United States, the stations are currently owned by Black Hills State University.

KBHU-FM and KJKT-FM are affiliated with the Intercollegiate Broadcast Corporation and the National Association of Broadcasters.

References

External links

BHU-FM
Modern rock radio stations in the United States
BHU-FM
Radio stations established in 1974